Heinrich Gottfried von Mattuschka (22 February 1734 – 9 November 1779) was a German botanist.

Biography
He was born at Jauer (now Jawor, Poland), on 22 February 1734. He wrote Flora silesiaca, and named many plants, notably Quercus petraea. He died at Pitschen (now Pyszczyn, Poland) on 9 November 1779.

References

1734 births
1779 deaths
Prussian nobility
Silesian nobility
People from Jawor
Matt. von Mattuschka, Heinrich Gottfried
18th-century German botanists
18th-century German writers
18th-century German male writers